E. G. Marshall (born Everett Eugene Grunz; June 18, 1914 – August 24, 1998) was an American actor, best known for his television roles as the lawyer Lawrence Preston on The Defenders in the 1960s and as neurosurgeon David Craig on The Bold Ones: The New Doctors in the 1970s. One of the first group selected for the new Actors Studio, by 1948 he had performed in major plays on Broadway.

Among his film roles Marshall is perhaps best known as the unflappable and analytical Juror 4 in Sidney Lumet's courtroom drama 12 Angry Men (1957). He played the President of the United States in Superman II (1980), and Nazi collaborator Henri Denault on the CBS prime-time drama Falcon Crest in 1982.  Marshall was also known as the host of the radio drama series, CBS Radio Mystery Theater (1974–82).

Early life
Marshall was born Everett Eugene Grunz in Owatonna, Minnesota, the son of Hazel Irene (née Cobb) and Charles G. Grunz. His paternal grandparents were German immigrants. During his life, he chose not to reveal what "E. G." stood for, saying that it stood for "Everybody's Guess." The U.S. Social Security Claims Index states that he was listed with the Social Security Administration in June 1937 as Everett Eugene Grunz, and in December 1975 as E.G. Marshall.

Marshall claimed in interviews in later life to have attended both Carleton College and the University of Minnesota, but there is no evidence that he ever attended either institution, or had attended college at all.

Career
He took the surname "Marshall" for his acting career. Although most familiar for his later television and movie roles, which gained wide audiences, Marshall also had a distinguished Broadway career. In 1948, having already performed in the original New York productions of The Skin of Our Teeth and The Iceman Cometh, Marshall joined Marlon Brando, Montgomery Clift, Julie Harris, Kim Stanley, and 45 others to make up the first group of actors granted membership in the newly formed Actors Studio. In subsequent years, he landed the leading roles in The Crucible and Waiting for Godot.

In 1973, he returned to the live stage to play the title role in a well-received production of Macbeth at the Virginia Museum Theatre in Richmond, Virginia, under the direction of Keith Fowler. The production was highly praised by the New York Times.  From January 1974 until February 1982, Marshall was an occasional participant and the original host of the popular nightly radio drama, The CBS Radio Mystery Theater.

Marshall was selected as a Fellow of the American Bar Association and an officer of the American Judicature Society, a national organization of judges, lawyers, and lay persons devoted to promoting the effective administration of justice.

Personal life
Marshall was married twice, in 1931 to Helen Wolf (divorced 1953) and then to Judith Coy. He had a total of five children: Jed, Sarah, Jill, Degen, and Sam.

As a member of the Committee for National Health Insurance, Marshall was a long-time advocate of government-provided health care in the United States. During the 1968 United States presidential campaign, he filmed and narrated a political advertisement endorsing Democratic candidate Hubert Humphrey.

Death
Marshall died of lung cancer in Bedford, New York, on August 24, 1998, at age 84. He was buried at Middle Patent Rural Cemetery, in the hamlet of Banksville, within the Town of North Castle, New York.

Filmography
 1945 The House on 92nd Street as Attendant At Morgue (uncredited)
 1946 13 Rue Madeleine as Emile (uncredited)
 1947 Untamed Fury as Pompano, the dance caller
 1948 Call Northside 777 as Rayska (uncredited)
 1952 Anything Can Happen as Immigration Officer (scenes deleted)
 1954 Middle of the Night as Jerry, On The Live TV Broadcast Philco-Goodyear Television Playhouse
 1954 The Caine Mutiny as Lieutenant Commander Challee
 1954 Broken Lance as Governor Horace
 1954 Pushover as Police Lieutenant Carl Eckstrom
 1954 The Bamboo Prison as Father Francis Dolan
 1954 The Silver Chalice as Ignatius
 1955 The Left Hand of God as Dr. David Sigman
 1956 The Scarlet Hour as Lieutenant Jennings
 1956 The Mountain as Solange
 1957 The Bachelor Party as Walter
 1957 12 Angry Men as Juror #4
 1957 Man on Fire as Sam Dunstock
 1957 Alfred Hitchcock Presents (TV) as Ronald J. Grimes
 1958 The Buccaneer as Governor William C. C. Claiborne  
 1959 The Journey as Harold Rhinelander
 1959 Compulsion as District Attorney Harold Horn
 1960 Cash McCall as Winston Conway
 1960 The Islanders as Curt Cober In "Forbidden Cargo (ABC-TV)
 1961 Town Without Pity as Colonel Jerome Pakenham
 1961–1965 The Defenders (CBS TV series) as Lawrence Preston
 1966 The Chase as Val Rogers
 1966 The Poppy Is Also a Flower as Coley Jones
 1966 Is Paris Burning? as Intelligence Officer Powell (uncredited)
 1969 The Bridge at Remagen as Brigadier General Shinner
 1969 The Learning Tree (uncredited)
 1969 The Littlest Angel (TV) as God
 1970 Tora! Tora! Tora! as Colonel Rufus S. Bratton
 1971 The Pursuit of Happiness as Daniel Lawrence
 1971 Ellery Queen: Don't Look Behind You (TV Movie) as Dr. Edward Cazalis
 1971 Night Gallery as Soames, The Funeral Director
 1975 Man: The Incredible Machine as The Narrator
 1976 Collision Course: Truman vs. MacArthur as President Harry S. Truman
 1977 Billy Jack Goes to Washington as Senator Joseph Paine
 1978 Interiors as Arthur
 1979 Vampire (TV Movie) as Harry Kilcoyne
 1980 Superman II as The President of the United States
 1981 Gangster Wars as The Narrator (voice)
 1982–1983 Falcon Crest as Henri Denault (3 episodes)
 1982 Creepshow as Upson Pratt (segment "They're Creeping Up On You")
 1983 Kennedy (TV miniseries) as Joseph P. Kennedy
 1986 My Chauffeur as Witherspoon
 1986 Power as Senator Sam Hastings, Ohio
 1986 La Gran Fiesta as Judge Cooper
 1987 At Mother's Request (TV Movie) as Franklin Bradshaw
 1988–1989 War and Remembrance (TV miniseries) as Dwight D. Eisenhower
 1989 National Lampoon's Christmas Vacation as Art Smith
 1990 Two Evil Eyes as Steven Pike (segment "The Facts in the Case of Mr. Valdemar")
 1992 Consenting Adults as George Gordon
 1992 Russian Holiday as Joe Meadows
 1993 Tornadoes!! The Entity (documentary) as The Narrator
 1993 The Tommyknockers (TV miniseries) as Ev Hillman
 1994–1995 Chicago Hope (eight episodes) as Dr. Arthur Thurmond
 1995 Nixon as John N. Mitchell
 1997 Absolute Power as Walter Sullivan
 1997 Miss Evers' Boys (TV Movie) as The Senate Chairman

Discography
 1956 Waiting for Godot with Bert Lahr
 1960 Ulysses: Soliloquies Of Molly And Leopold Bloom as read by Siobhan McKenna, E.G. Marshall.
 1978 The Great Debates: Hamilton And Jefferson with Shepperd Strudwick
 1981 Justice Holmes' Decisions (nominated for Grammy Award for Best Spoken Word, Documentary or Drama Recording in 1982)
 1985 Runaway Jonah And Other Biblical Adventures by Jan Wahl

References

External links

 
 
 
 
 

1914 births
1998 deaths
American male film actors
American male radio actors
American male television actors
American people of German descent
Male actors from Minnesota
Deaths from lung cancer in New York (state)
People from Owatonna, Minnesota
Outstanding Performance by a Lead Actor in a Drama Series Primetime Emmy Award winners
American male Shakespearean actors
American male stage actors
20th-century American male actors
People from Bedford, New York
Minnesota Democrats
New York (state) Democrats